United States senators are elected in Indiana to serve in Class 1 and Class 3. Senators serve six years terms and are elected in statewide elections. Beginning in 1914, Indiana began electing senators by popular vote, prior to that senators were elected by the Indiana General Assembly.

This list contains only those elected directly the voters of the state.

U.S. Senate elections (Class 1)

U.S. Senate elections (Class 3)

See also

 Elections in Indiana

References

Sources
 

 
Indiana